Sham Shui Po Ferry Pier was a ferry pier in Sham Shui Po, Kowloon, Hong Kong that operated from 1924 to 1992. It was one of the important ferry piers in West Kowloon and had a bus terminus nearby.

History 
The pier began operating in 1924, located on the coast at the junction of Tung Chau Street and Pei Ho Street. It provided ferry services to and from Central, Sheung Wan and Macau. It was relocated to the shore next to Yen Chow Street in 1979 to cope with land reclamation work and the construction of the Nam Cheong Estate.

The ferry service to and from Sheung Wan was terminated in 1979 due to the destruction of Wilmer Street pier in Sheung Wan by a typhoon. The service to and from Macau was terminated in 1989 and replaced by the Hong Kong China Ferry Terminal in Tsim Sha Tsui. The service between Central and Sham Shui Po was terminated in 1992 and the pier was also closed. However, the bus terminus was still in use until it was replaced by another bus terminal in Tonkin Street in 1999.

The Fu Cheong Estate has since been built on the former site of the bus terminus. The pier has also been reclaimed and the MTR Nam Cheong station now stands in its place.

Bus routes 
There were several bus routes that terminated at Sham Shui Po Ferry Pier Bus Terminus before it was closed in 1999.
KMB 2A: To Kowloon City Ferry Pier / Ngau Tau Kok
KMB 2B (2nd generation): To Hung Hom Ferry Pier / Kowloon City Ferry Pier
KMB 2F (1st generation): To Tai Wo Ping
KMB 4: To Jordan Road Ferry Pier
KMB 12: To Hong Kong China Ferry Terminal
KMB 12A: To Whampoa Garden
KMB 18: To Kowloon City Ferry Pier / Hung Hom Ferry Pier / Hung Hom station / Whampoa Garden
KMB 31B: To Shek Lei Estate
KMB 33: To Tsuen Wan Ferry Pier
KMB 33A (1st generation): To North Kwai Chung
KMB 33A (2nd generation): To Middle Kwai Chung
KMB 33B: To Kwai Hing Estate
KMB 33C: To Kwai Fong Estate
KMB 35A: To Shek Yam Estate
KMB 36A: To Lei Muk Shue Estate
KMB 37A: To East Kwai Shing
KMB 41A: To Cheung On Estate
KMB 44 (Special route): To Tsing Yi Estate
KMB 44B: To Cheung Ching Estate
KMB 46: To Lai Yiu Estate
KMB 52X: To Tuen Mun Town Centre
KMB 59A: To Tuen Mun Ferry Pier
KMB 68A (1st generation): To Long Ping Estate
KMB 72: To Tai Po Market
KMB/CMB/NWFB 114: To Central (Hong Kong Macau Ferry Terminal) (now Route 914)
KMB/CMB/CTB 117: To Happy Valley (Lower)
KMB 212: To Whampoa Garden
KMB/CMB/NWFB 914: To Causeway Bay (Tin Hau)

See also
List of demolished piers in Hong Kong

References

Demolished piers in Hong Kong
1924 establishments in Hong Kong
1992 disestablishments in Hong Kong
Sham Shui Po
Victoria Harbour